Jennifer Cudjoe (born 7 March 1994) is a Ghanaian professional soccer player who plays as a midfielder for NJ/NY Gotham FC in the National Women's Soccer League (NWSL).

Club career

Sky Blue FC
Cudjoe signed a short-term contract with Sky Blue FC for the 2020 NWSL Challenge Cup. She made her NWSL debut on 30 June 2020.

Cudjoe was selected by Racing Louisville FC in the 2020 NWSL Expansion Draft, but Sky Blue soon acquired her back in a trade.

Honors
Individual
 Ghanaian Female Footballer of the Year: 2015

References

External links
 Northeastern Oklahoma A&M profile
 Northeastern State University profile
 Maine-Fort Kent profile

1994 births
Living people
Ghanaian women's footballers
Footballers from Accra
University of Maine at Fort Kent alumni
Women's association football midfielders
Northeastern Oklahoma A&M Golden Norsemen and Lady Norse athletes
California Storm players
NJ/NY Gotham FC players
Women's Premier Soccer League players
Ghanaian expatriate footballers
Expatriate women's soccer players in the United States
Ghanaian expatriate sportspeople in the United States
Northeastern State RiverHawks athletes
UMFK Bengals
National Women's Soccer League players
Ghanaian expatriate women's footballers
Hasaacas Ladies F.C. players